Heinz Müller (16 September 1924 – 25 September 1975) was a German road bicycle racer who won the UCI Road Cycling World Championship in 1952. He also won the German National Road Race in 1953.

Palmares

1949 – Bauer
 1st, Stage 9, Deutschland Tour
 4th, National Road Race Championship
1950 – Bauer
 8th, Overall, Deutschland Tour
 Winner Stages 7 & 15
1951 – Bauer, Adria
 1st, Stage 9, Deutschland Tour
1952 – Bauer, Tebag
  World Road Race Champion
 1st, Köln Classic
 4th, Overall, Deutschland Tour
 Winner Stages 5, 9b & 11
1953 – Bauer, Tigra, La Perle
  Road Race Champion
 1st, Stage 5, Tour du Sud-Est
 1st, Stuttgart
 3rd, National Sprint Championship
 3rd, Overall, Deutsches Dreitagerennen
 Winner Stage 1
 4th, Overall, Midi Libre
1954 – Tebag
 1st, GP Herperdorsfer
1955 – Tebag, Rabeneick, Bismarck
 1st, GP Express
 4th, Overall, Deutschland Tour
 Winner Stages 5 & 7
 5th, National Road Race Championship
1956 – Bauer, Rabeneick
 1st, GP Continental
 3rd, National Road Race Championship
1957 – Altenburger, Feru, Fichtel & Sachs
 1st, Köln Classic
 1st, Stage 8, Tour de Suisse
 3rd, National Madison Championship (with Walter Schurmann)
 5th, National Road Race Championship
1958 – Altenburger, Feru, Molteni, Solo
 1st, Berner Rundfahrt
1959 – Altenburger, Feru
1960 – Torpedo

References

External links

1924 births
1975 deaths
People from Schwarzwald-Baar-Kreis
Sportspeople from Freiburg (region)
People from the Free People's State of Württemberg
German male cyclists
UCI Road World Champions (elite men)
Tour de Suisse stage winners
German cycling road race champions
Cyclists from Baden-Württemberg
20th-century German people